This is a list of wars involving Afghanistan.

References

 
Afghanistan
Wars
Wars